Monalisa Changkija is an Indian journalist and poet from Nagaland. She is the founding editor and publisher of the daily newspaper Nagaland Page. She was a member of the Working Group on Women's Empowerment in the Indian National Planning Commission.

Life
Tiamerenla Monalisa Changkija was born in Jorhat, Assam on 2 March 1960. Her family belongs to the Ao Naga community.

She attended school in Jorhat and Kohima, Nagaland. She obtained an undergraduate degree in Political Science from Hindu College, Delhi, followed by a master's degree from Delhi University.

Changkija married Bendangtoshi Longkümer. She has two daughters. Her husband died in 2017.

Career
Changkija began her career as a journalist with the Nagaland Times in 1985. She wrote a column, "The State of Affairs", for this paper, and another titled "Of Roses and Thorns" for the weekly paper Ura Mail. Both the papers were based in Dimapur.

During the long-running insurgency in Nagaland, Changkija began to write poetry and short stories to protest the violence, and to criticise the condition of society that led to the unrest. Changkija's writings put her in grave risk from the militants. Her editor at the Ura Mail was murdered in 1992. Changkija's poem Not be dead was written to honour his memory.

Changkija founded the Nagaland Page in 1999. Focussing on issues affecting the state of Nagaland, she upset both the state government and the militants. An article published in her paper titled "State is a reality and sovereignty is a myth" led to demands from the terrorists that she disclose the author's name. When she refused, she was threatened with retribution.

In 2004, bombing at Dimapur's Hong Kong market resulted in the deaths of hundreds. Changkija's impassioned Child of Cain was printed soon after.

Changkija's 2014 book Cogitating for a Better Deal was banned by the Ao Senden, an organisation that claimed to be a statutory apex judiciary body. They accused her of making false allegations against it. In particular, they objected to her statement that it was a non-governmental organisation rather than a mandated arbitrator in Ao tribal affairs.

Selected works

Poetry

Non-fiction

Awards
Chameli Devi Jain Award for Outstanding Woman Mediaperson (2009)
 30th FICCI Women Achiever of the Year 2013-2014 for Outstanding Contributions as a Journalist (2014)

See also 
 Nagaland Page

References

Sources
 
 
 
 
 
 

Living people
Delhi University alumni
20th-century Indian poets
21st-century Indian poets
Indian women short story writers
20th-century Indian journalists
21st-century Indian journalists
Hindu College, Delhi alumni
People from Jorhat district
Poets from Assam
Women writers from Assam
20th-century Indian women writers
21st-century Indian women writers
21st-century Indian writers
Indian women journalists
21st-century Indian short story writers
Year of birth missing (living people)
Naga people